Anshul Trivedi is an Indian actor known for his works in Hindi cinema and Indian television. He appeared as a lead in Balika vadhu 2 , Trideviyaan, Khidki, Saraswatichandra, Ishq Ka Rang Safed, Ek Rishta Aisa Bhi, Kaali - Ek Punar Avataar, Raam Leela and Ramayai Vastavaiya. He did a short story "Love by Chance" for UTV Bindass, Bisaat Rishton Ki and Main Lakshmi Tere Aangan Ki.

Early life
Anshul Trivedi is a Gujarati. He grew up in his hometown Vadodara, Gujarat, and also spent five years in Atul, Valsad

Career
He did bachelors in Business Administration (B.B.A) from Maharaja Sayajirao University of Baroda and Post graduation in Public Relations & Corporate Communications (P.R.C.C) from Xavier's Institute of Communications (XIC) from St. Xavier's College, Mumbai. He is professionally trained in Hindustani Shastriya Sangeet (Indian classical) for 7 years. He was the winner of Sugama Sangeetha (Light Vocal) competition in the year 2004 at National Youth Festival (India). He has also won state-level swimming competitions for 3 consecutive years and represented the Indian state of Gujarat at National level swimming championship organised by Ministry of Youth Affairs and Sports. While he was graduating, music maestro Viju Shah heard him singing at one of the competitions and offered him to come down to Mumbai and perform with him in Navratri Shows and other shows. This was the beginning of his music career. He worked with Viju Shah for more than 5 years and did many live performances. 
After his post graduation in PR and Corporate Communications, he got placed at CMCG India – a PR firm founded in Mumbai. Before the completion of probation period, he quite his first job and started pursuing his dream of becoming an actor. Anshul has worked with film directors and producers such as Sanjay Leela Bhansali, Prabhu Deva, Umesh Shukla, and Vikram Bhatt

Filmography

Web series

Television

References

Living people
Male actors from Mumbai
Male actors in Hindi television
Gujarati people
Male actors in Gujarati-language films
People from Vadodara
21st-century Indian male actors
Year of birth missing (living people)